Al-Quniyah (Syriac: ܩܢܙܐ, also spelled Quniya) is a village in northwestern Syria, administratively belonging to the Idlib Governorate, located northwest of Idlib, 35 km north of Jisr ash-Shugur, and is in between Lattakia and Aleppo. Al-Quniyah is situated 450 meters (1476 ft) above sea level. According to the Syria Central Bureau of Statistics, al-Quniyah had a population of 587 in the 2004 census. Its inhabitants are predominantly Catholic Christians.

Geography 
Nearby localities include Kafr Dibbin (Hamama) to the east, Zarzur, Amud, and Darkush to the northeast, Yakubiyah, Judaida to the west and Jisr al-Shughur to the south.

Town climate is Mediterranean, whereas the winter is cold, rainy, snowy at times; the summer is warm.

Etymology 

Some sources indicate that the current name of the village is derived from :

The Syriac language Qunaya means "Kingdom".
The Syriac language Qunaya means "Livelihood and Money".

History 
Some archaeological artifacts date back to 2000 BC 
There is an ancient church in the village cemetery of the Church of St.Kiprianos from the fifth century AD.

Missionaries of the Franciscan Fathers (the Holy Land Rangers) (From Latin Catholic) came to the village in 1878 and built a church, Monastery, clinic and the first Arabic school in northwestern Syria, they re-built the church in 1885 and the current church dates to 1932.

Postal Service began in 1927 and the telephone arrived to the village in 1929. The municipality was established in 1932 and electricity came to the village in 1935 and the customs in 1937.

In January 2013, during the ongoing Syrian civil war, al-Quniyah and the nearby Christian-inhabited villages of al-Yacoubiyah and Judayda were captured by anti-government rebels.

References

External links 
Qunaya.com

Populated places in Jisr al-Shughur District
Eastern Orthodox Christian communities in Syria
Christian communities in Syria